"Steve McQueen" is a song by American singer-songwriter Sheryl Crow. It is the lead track from her fourth studio album, C'mon, C'mon (2002). It was released as the second single from the album on July 1, 2002. The song reached  88 on the US Billboard Hot 100 and became a dance hit, peaking at No. 11 on the Billboard Dance Club Play chart. It also won a Grammy Award for Best Female Rock Vocal Performance, Crow's fourth win in the category. The single's music video was directed by Wayne Isham and features Crow racing around in various vehicles, recreating scenes from Steve McQueen movies.

Track listings
US CD single and UK cassette single
 "Steve McQueen" – 3:24
 "If It Makes You Happy" (live from Abbey Road Studios) – 3:45

UK CD1
 "Steve McQueen" (album version) – 3:24
 "The Difficult Kind" (live from Abbey Road Studios) – 6:35
 "If It Makes You Happy" (live from Abbey Road Studios) – 3:45
 "Soak Up the Sun" (video) – 3:49

UK CD2
 "Steve McQueen" – 3:24
 "If It Makes You Happy" (live from Abbey Road Studios) – 3:45
 "My Favorite Mistake" (live from Abbey Road Studios) – 4:02

European CD single
 "Steve McQueen" (album version) – 3:24
 "The Difficult Kind" (live from Abbey Road Studios) – 6:35

Credits and personnel
Credits are lifted from the C'mon, C'mon album booklet.

Studios
 Recorded at various studios in the United States and United Kingdom
 Mixed at Soundtrack Studios (New York City)
 Mastered at Masterdisk (New York City)

Personnel

 Sheryl Crow – writing, vocals, acoustic guitar, maracas, production
 John Shanks – writing, electric guitar, bass, drum loops, percussion loops, samples, production
 Doyle Bramhall II – backing vocals
 Craig Ross – electric guitar
 Steve Jordan – drums, tambora
 Shawn Pelton – drums
 Lenny Castro – congas
 Trina Shoemaker – recording
 Eric Tew – recording
 Andy Wallace – mixing
 Steve Sisco – mixing assistant
 Howie Weinberg – mastering

Charts

Release history

References

2002 singles
Grammy Award for Best Female Rock Vocal Performance
Music videos directed by Wayne Isham
Sheryl Crow songs
Songs about actors
Songs written by John Shanks
Songs written by Sheryl Crow